Norman Loves Rose is a 1982 Australian comedy film.

Plot summary

A 13-year-old Jewish boy (Norman) develops an obsession for his older brother's wife (Rose), who is under parental pressure to start a family. The hapless dentist brother is not up to the job, and ditsy Rose encourages Norman's infatuation. While it is never made explicit how it came about, Rose eventually does become pregnant, to the satisfaction of the various interested parties.

Cast
Carol Kane as Rose
Tony Owen as Norman
Myra De Groot as Mother
David Downer as Michael
Barry Otto as Charles
Sandy Gore as Maureen
Warren Mitchell as Morris
Louise Pajo as Shirley

Production
Henri Safran had been looking for a comedy script to direct, and being unable to find one he was happy with, he decided to write one himself.

Reception
Sandra Hall in The Bulletin said, "the comedy relies on a certain amount of obtuseness, literal mindedness, double-takes and talking at cross-purposes. The characters are there to be laughed at, not with, and to that end much over-acting is done. Nobody turns out to be particularly likeable."

References

External links

Norman Loves Rose at Oz Movies

Australian comedy films
Films directed by Henri Safran
1982 films
1980s English-language films
1980s Australian films